Philip Wiegratz (born 1993) is a German former actor. His first and most famous film role was playing Augustus Gloop in Tim Burton's Charlie and the Chocolate Factory.

Life and career 
Wiegratz was born in Magdeburg. He is known for his 2005 portrayal of the greedy Augustus Gloop in Charlie and the Chocolate Factory. He went to a casting call not being sure of receiving any particular part, but caught the attention of a casting director and was placed on a shortlist for the role of Augustus. Wiegratz returned for several callbacks and eventually received the part, which marked his English-language film debut and also required him to wear a fatsuit instead of getting fat on his own terms. He performed his own stunts in the scenes of Augustus falling into the river in Wonka's Chocolate Room. 

In 2006, Wiegratz starred in the eponymous film version of Cornelia Funke's Die Wilden Hühner as a member of an all-boys group called the Pygmies, and returned for a sequel the following year. Both pictures were commercial successes, and he and several co-stars were guests on the German children's television program Ki.Ka Live on 2 April 2007. In 2012, he played Helmut in Lore, and Gordon Gelderman in Ruby Red, in 2013.

Filmography 
 Charlie and the Chocolate Factory (2005)
  (2005)
 Berndivent (one episode, 2006)
 Die Wilden Hühner (2006)
 Die Wilden Hühner und die Liebe (2007)
 Ki.Ka Live (one episode, 2007)
 Die Wilden Hühner und das Leben (2009)
 Lore (2012)
 Ruby Red (2013)

External links 
 

1993 births
German male child actors
Living people
German male television actors
People from Saxony-Anhalt
German male film actors
German male actors